K.A.P. Viswanatham Medical College is a medical college started in 1997 and named after famous Tamil scholar K.A.P. Viswanatham. It started with a capacity to accommodate 100 Under graduate students. Since the year 2007, Post graduate courses were also started. Mahatma Gandhi Memorial Government Hospital is attached to K.A.P.V Medical College. It is situated 2 km away from the college campus. It run by the state government of Tamil Nadu, which is recognized by the National Medical Commission. It is located in the city of Trichy, in Tamil Nadu. The college was ranked third by students in counselling in 2010.

Admission 
The college admits 150 students to the MBBS course once every year through NEET. Of this 85% is state quota which is allotted by DME of Government of Tamil Nadu and the remaining 15% is All India Quota allotted by MCC of Central Government of Republic of India.

Facilities
The college has more than 30 departments. There are three men's hostels and two women's hostels on campus. It has a stadium that seats 750. There are four lecture halls with over 150 seats. The Central Library is home to over 7,000 books and national and international journals. It has two reading halls, one for masters and the other for professors. There are two indoor and outdoor sports facilities, including a gymnasium, a basketball court, a feather ball stadium, a badminton and two volleyball courts. It also has the ability to play round ball, golf ball, table tennis, soccer and foot ball.

Courses offered

Undergraduate Medical Course

Postgraduate Medical Courses

Super Speciality Courses

Diplomo Courses
 Diploma in Nursing (Three and a half years including six months Internship)
 Diploma in Medical Laboratory Technology (Two years)

Technician Courses
Theatre Technician (1 Year)
Anaesthesia Technician (1 Year) 
Orthopaedic Technician (1 Year)
Emergency Care Technician (1 Year)
Respiratory Therapy Technician (1 Year)
Certified of Radiological Assistant (1 Year)

Other Courses
Nursing Assistant Course (1 Year)
Physician Assistant

See also
 List of Tamil Nadu Government's Educational Institutions
 List of Tamil Nadu Government's Medical Colleges

References

External links 
 

Medical colleges in Tamil Nadu
Universities and colleges in Tiruchirappalli
Educational institutions established in 1997
1997 establishments in Tamil Nadu